Maurizio Arcieri (30 April 1942 – 29 January 2015) was an Italian singer who was a member of 1960s Italian beat band the New Dada, and 1970s/'80s band Krisma.

Career
In the spring of 1967, the New Dada supported the Beatles at their Milan concert. The group eventually split. Some members of the New Dada followed Maurizio as supporting group.
"Ballerina" and "Il comizio" were released.

Maurizio participated at the "Disco per l'Estate" Festival with "Cinque Minuti e poi..."; the song is one of the greatest hits of the year and the leit-motiv of "Quelli belli siamo noi" ("We Are the Beautiful Ones"), a "musicarello" (musical comedy movie) in which Maurizio acts and sings some of his hits. The movie features - among others - Carlo Dapporto, Carlo delle Piane, Isabella Biagini, Ric e Gian and  a young Loredana Bertè. Maurizio was invited as a guest in the most important TV shows of the time. Some videos of those appearances are now available.
The album "Maurizio - 1970" is released.

The albums "Maurizio - 1975" (a collection of Maurizio's cool seventies singles), and "Trasparenze" (a progressive experiment) were released.

Maurizio was then chosen as the Italian narrator for the pan-European album The Rock Peter and the Wolf, a Polydor project that involves Brian Eno, Phil Collins, Alvin Lee, Manfred Mann and many others. In 2014 he also worked in the film-comedy Sexy Shop.

Arcieri died on 29 January 2015, in Varese, Italy, aged 72.

Family
He was married to Christina Moser.

Discography

Albums
 (1970) Maurizio (Joker/Saar)
 (1975) Maurizio (Polydor)
 (1975) Trasparenze (Polydor)

Singles
 (1967) "Ballerina" / "Non C'è Bisogno Di Camminare" (Bluebell)
 (1967) "Lady Jane" / T'Amo Da Morire" (Bluebell)
 (1967) "Il Comizio (di Maurizio)" / "Il Fiore All'Occhiello" (SAAR/Joker)
 (1968) "Cinque Minuti e Poi..." / "Un'Ora Basterà" (SAAR/Joker)
 (1968) "Era Solo Ieri" / "Ricomincio Da Zero (Natural Born Loser)" (SAAR/Joker)
 (1969) "Elizabeth" / "Sirena" (SAAR/Joker)
 (1969) "24 Ore Spese Bene Con Amore" / "Cade Qualche Fiocco Di Neve" (Polydor)
 (1971) "Rose Blu" / "Il Mare Tra Le Mani" (Polydor)
 (1971) "L'Uomo e La Matita" / "La Gloria e L'Amore" (Polydor)
 (1972) "Deserto" / "La Decisione" (Polydor)
 (1972) "I Giochi Del Cuore" / "Un Uomo" (Polydor)
 (1973) "Scusa" / "Un Giorno Da Re" (Polydor)
 (1974) "Un Dolce Scandalo" / "Il Grigio Nella Mente" (Polydor)
 (1974) "Stagioni Fuori Tempo" / "Un Dolce Scandalo" (Polydor)
 (1975) "Guardami, Toccami, Guariscimi" / "Prima Estate" (Polydor)

Collaborations
 (1976) Peter and the Wolf, Italian narrative voice (RSO, production by Jack Lancaster, Robin Lumley and Denis McKay)

References

External links
 Maurizio pages on Chinese Restaurant
 Raro! Vintage Records Magazine
 Vintage Records Specialists
Maurizio's records on mayancaper.net
Maurizio's videos on mayancaper.net
Maurizio on KrismaTv.net

1942 births
2015 deaths
Italian pop singers
Singers from Milan
20th-century Italian male singers